Jørgen Aarre Mohus (born 5 September 1991) is a Norwegian football goalkeeper who is currently a free agent.

He started his youth career in Tertnes IL, and joined the city's great team SK Brann in 2009. After loan spells at Åsane Fotball he made his first-team league debut in November 2012 in a 2–1 loss against Viking. He never broke through at Brann, and in 2014 he spent one season in Bærum SK.

Career statistics

References

1991 births
Living people
Footballers from Bergen
Norwegian footballers
Association football goalkeepers
SK Brann players
Åsane Fotball players
Bærum SK players
Eliteserien players
Norwegian First Division players